Jade Green may refer to:

Jade Green (EastEnders), fictional character
Jade (color), a shade of green